The South Omaha City Hall is part of the South Omaha Main Street Historic District located at 5002 South 24th Street in the South Omaha neighborhood of Omaha, Nebraska. It was designed by notable local architect John Latenser, Sr.

History 
Built in the 1890s at the cost of $50,000,

When South Omaha merged with the City of Omaha in 1915, the merger called for specific and numerated services to be continued to the community as a part of the merger agreement. City Hall was rehabilitated in the late 1980s in honor of the merger agreement, and the building continued to house driver licensing and testing, courts and police facilities. The City stopped services in the 1990s, and sold the building for commercial purposes.

See also 
 History of Omaha, Nebraska

References

External links 
 Modern photo

History of Omaha, Nebraska
Government buildings completed in 1917
History of South Omaha, Nebraska
City and town halls in Nebraska